ADAC Formula 4 was a racing series regulated according to FIA Formula 4 regulations. The inaugural season was the 2015 ADAC Formula 4. It replaced the ADAC Formel Masters, held from 2008 to 2014.

History
Gerhard Berger and the FIA Single Seater Commission launched the FIA Formula 4 in March 2013. The goal of Formula 4 is to make the ladder to Formula 1 more transparent. Besides sporting and technical regulations, costs are regulated too. A car to compete in this category may not exceed a price of €30,000. A single season in Formula 4 may not exceed €100,000 in costs. ADAC F4 will be the one of the second phase Formula 4 championships to be launched. The first phase championships were the Italian F4 Championship and Formula 4 Sudamericana which started in 2014. The ADAC championship was launched by the ADAC on 16 July 2014. Italian race car constructor Tatuus was contracted to design and build all the cars.

After the end of the 2022 season, which was understaffed by drivers, there was a long wait for the publication of a racing calendar for 2023. This, together with the rumors about the takeover of the DTM by the ADAC, which was also carried out on 2 December 2022, gave rise to speculation that the championship would not be continued. On 3 December, ADAC announced that ADAC Formula 4 would no longer be advertised for the 2023 season. The high costs compared to other national Formula 4 championships and the low number of drivers are given as reasons for the end of the championship. Only eleven drivers were registered for the last race at the Nürburgring in mid-October, while a week later a total of 41 drivers started at the last race of the Italian F4 race in Scarperia e San Piero.

Car

The championship features Tatuus designed and built cars. The cars are constructed out of carbon fibre and feature a monocoque chassis. The engine is a 1.4L turbo Abarth. This is the same engine as in the Italian F4 Championship.

Champions

Drivers

Teams

Rookies
The result of the championship was decided by different standings. Wins and points of the rookie standings are present in brackets.

Drivers graduated to F2 

 Bold denotes an active Formula 2 driver.
 Gold background denotes ADAC Formula 4 champion.

Circuits

Notes

References

External links

 

 
Formula racing series
Formula 4 series
Auto racing series in Germany
Recurring sporting events established in 2015
Recurring sporting events disestablished in 2022
2015 establishments in Germany
2022 disestablishments in Germany